The La Mamounia literary award (French: prix de La Mamounia) was a Moroccan literary prize founded to promote Moroccan literature written in French. It was awarded from 2010 to 2015 and carried a prize money of 200,000 dirhams (about $22,000 in 2015).

The award was donated by the La Mamounia hotel in Marrakesh, which also hosted the award ceremonies every year. A jury consisting of well known literary figures selected the recipient out of a varying number of nominations every year. From 2011 on the jury was led by the French writer and critic Christine Orban as president. Other jury members included the writers Douglas Kennedy (USA), Marie Laberge (Canada), and Alain Mabanckou (Republic of the Congo).  

Due to financial issues the prize was not awarded after 2015.

Recipients

2010: Mahi Binebine
2011: Mohamed Leftah
2012: Mohamed Nedali
2013: Rachid O
2014: Réda Dalil
2015: Leïla Slimani

References

External links 
Boyd Tonkin: The wonders of Moroccan literature. The Independent, 2014-10-02
Lara Marlowe: Sex, addiction and shattering tradition in Moroccan literature. The Irish Times, 2015-09-26
Sue Ryan: La Mamounia Literary Prize. The Arbuturian, 2013-10-14

Moroccan literary awards